"You" is a song recorded by the Australian singer Nathaniel. The song was digitally released through DNA Songs / Sony on 27 September 2013, as his debut single with a major label. "You" peaked at number four on the ARIA Singles Chart and it was certified two times platinum by the Australian Recording Industry Association for selling 140,000 copies. The accompanying music video was released on 8 October 2013.

Background and production
"You" was written by Nathaniel along with Anthony Egizii and David Musumeci from DNA Songs. Egizii and Musumeci also produced the track.

Reception
A writer for Take 40 Australia said "'You' is a mixture of Prince and Miguel." He also praised Nathaniel because he is able to hit the high notes live. "You" debuted at number nine on the ARIA Singles Chart dated 7 October and peaked at number four the following week. "You" became Nathaniel's first top-five single. In its fourteenth week, "You" was certified two times platinum by the Australian Recording Industry Association for selling 140,000 copies.

Promotion
The official video was released on 8 October 2013. It so far has over 1,326,000 views on VEVO. Nathaniel performed "You" during the fifth season of The X Factor Australia on 7 October. He then performed "You" as a special guest on the thirteenth season of Dancing With The Stars Australia on 3 November 2013.

Track listing
Digital download
 "You" – 3:22

CD single
"You"
"I Got a Feeling"

Credits and personnel
Personnel
Songwriting and production –  Anthony Egizii and David Musumeci

Charts

Weekly charts

Year-end charts

Certifications

Release history

References

2013 singles
2013 songs
Nathaniel Willemse songs
Songs written by David Musumeci
Songs written by Anthony Egizii
Song recordings produced by DNA Songs
Sony Music Australia singles